Lana`i is a Hawaiian island.

Lanai may also refer to:
 Lanai (architecture), a type of patio
 Lanai City, Hawaii